Eno Raud (15 February 1928 – 10 July 1996) was an Estonian children's writer. His works are considered classics in Estonia as well as in the other former Soviet countries. Raud was included in International Board on Books for Young People (IBBY) Honour List in 1974.

Early life and career 
Raud was born in Tartu to writer Mart Raud and Lea Raud. He studied Estonian language and literature at the University of Tartu in 1952. From 1952 to 1956 he worked in the National Library of Estonia, from 1956 to 1965 in the Estonian State Publishing House. After that he retired and devoted himself to writing. He died in Haapsalu, aged 68.

Raud penned more than 50 books of stories and poems over his lifetime. His most popular works include Three Jolly Fellows, A Story with Flying Saucers, The Gothamites and Raggie. The author's children's books have been translated into more than 30 languages.

Personal 
Eno Raud was married to writer Aino Pervik; their children are scholar and author Rein Raud, musician and writer Mihkel Raud and children's writer and illustrator Piret Raud.

Bibliography 
Selected Estonian titles in chronological order
Sipsik (Raggie), 1962
Kilplased (The Gothamites), 1962
Tuli pimendatud linnas (A Light in a Darkened City), 1967
Päris kriminaalne lugu (A Quite Criminal Tale), 1968
Lugu lendavate taldrikutega (A Story with Flying Saucers), 1969
Telepaatiline lugu (A Telepathic Tale), 1970
Naksitrallid (Three Jolly Fellows. 1–2), 1972
Jälle need Naksitrallid (Three Jolly Fellows. 3–4), 1979

Translations 
Selected translations

Raggie

 Lithuanian: Cypliukas, Gimtasis Žodis 2006
 Russian: Сипсик, Tammerraamat 2010, 2012, 2015
 Russian: Сипсик, Детская литература 1979, 1980, РОСМЭН 2013

A Story with Flying Saucers

 Hungarian: A repülő csészealjak története, Móra 1985
 Greek: Kedros, 1982, 1984
 Azerbaijani: 1982
 Slovak: Lietajúce taniere, Pravda 1981
 Romanian/Moldova: О историе ку „фарфурий збурэтоаре”, Литература артистикэ 1980
 Bulgarian: История с „летящи чинии”, Народна младеж 1978
 Latvian: Lidojošie šķīvji, Liesma 1977
 German: Die Geschichte mit den fliegenden Untertassen, Eesti Raamat 1976, Perioodika 1978
 Russian: История с „летающими тарелками”, Детская литературa 1977
 Finnish: Lentävän lautasen arvoitus, WSOY 1975

The Gothamites

 English: The Gothamites, Brooklyn, NY: Elsewhere Editions 2019

Three Jolly Fellows, books 1–4

 Russian: Муфта, Полботинка и Моховая Борода, newest ed. НИГМА 2015
 Latvian: Naksitrallīši (Books 1–2), Zvaigzne ABC 2010
 German: Drei lustige Gesellen, Leiv 2009–2012
 Lithuanian: Pabaldukai (Books 1–2), Vaga 1998

Awards
 1970: All-Union Children's and Youth Literature Competition, 1st prize (Fire in a Darkened City)
 1970: Annual Prize of Literature of the Estonian SSR (The Inquisitive Film Camera, A Story with Flying Saucers)
 1974: IBBY Honour List (Three Jolly Fellows. 1)
 1978: Honored Writer of the Estonian SSR
 1980: Annual J. Smuul Award for Literature (Three Jolly Fellows. 1)
 1987: Estonian State Prize (Three Jolly Fellows. 1–4)
 1996: Karl Eduard Sööt Children's Poetry Award (posthumously) (A Fish Takes a Walk)

References

1928 births
1996 deaths
People from Tartu
Estonian children's writers
20th-century Estonian writers
University of Tartu alumni